Werner Peiner (20 July 1897 - 19 August 1984) was a German painter. He was first influenced by realism, and later by New Objectivity, but he would become known has one of the most talented official painters of the Third Reich.

Life and career
Peiner was born in Düsseldorf, the son of the merchant Joseph Peiner (1867-1945) and his wife Sophia, née Maintz (1871-1951). Peiner grew up in Düsseldorf, where his father had risen to become the managing director of a wood wholesaler. He attended school up to the Oberprima. When the First World War broke out, he volunteered for the army with a Uhlan regiment. He was promoted to lieutenant and served on the western front. 

After the war, Peiner studied at the Düsseldorf Art Academy, since 1919, after initially taking private lessons from Wilhelm Döringer, a friend of his father. In the 1920s he guested and painted with Katharina "Nette" Faymonville in the Burghotel zu Kronenburg in the Eifel. During this time he joined forces with Fritz Burmann and Richard Gessner to form the "Dreimann-Bund". In 1923 Peiner married Marie Therese "Resi" Lauffs and moved to Bonn to live with his in-laws. The couple had no children; in 1950 they adopted the orphaned daughter of a cousin. In mid-1925 Peiner set up a studio in Düsseldorf. During this time, through the mediation of his friends, the architect Emil Fahrenkamp and the entrepreneur Walter Kruspig (since 1930 general director of Rhenania-Ossag), Peiner accepted artistic commissions for the design of church, insurance and industrial buildings.

In 1931, Peiner settled in Kronenburg and began converting several houses in the historic town center into a studio. Today, one of them is used as a hotel. Peiner played a key role in the construction of the sewage system in Kronenburg (but not in the valley settlement of Kronenburgerhütte), as the sewage running across the street bothered him. Street lamps designed by him can still be found in Kronenburg today.

Peiner style was closer to the New Objectivity during the Weimar Republic, but he would accept the Third Reich, and would become one of his official artists. In 1933 he was appointed professor of monumental painting at the Düsseldorf Art Academy. He succeeded Heinrich Campendonk, who had been dismissed shortly before. Peiner owed his appointment not only to his acquaintance with the provisional director of the art academy, Julius Paul Junghanns, but probably also to his painting Deutsche Erde, or German Land, with which he supported the emerging Nazi ideology of blood and soil. The painting was donated by the town of Mechernich to Schleiden district administrator Josef Schramm. Schleiden NSDAP district leader Franz Binz handed it personally to Adolf Hitler. According to Rolf Dettmann , a student of Peiner's, Peiner's friendship with Kruspig could also have played a role in the appointment.

Peiner had a tense relationship with Peter Grund, the director of the Düsseldorf Academy since 1933/1934. With the consent of Hermann Göring, Peiner undertook a study trip to East Africa from February 1935, which Kruspig had organized and financed. Through Kruspig's mediation, Peiner had personal access to Göring. In a talk with Göring on January 24, 1936, Peiner succeeded in getting his wish to found his own academy. On March 23, 1936, the minister for art, science and popular education issued a decree establishing the “Landakademie Kronenburg der Staatliche Kunstakademie Düsseldorf”. As the Hermann Göring Master School for Painting, it became independent under the direction of Peiner, in 1938. Peiner's students in Kronenburg included Rolf Dettmann, Heinz Hindorf, Hans Lohbeck, Willi Sitte and Willi Wewer. Among other things, Peiner designed monumental tapestries for the New Reich Chancellery. A nude of his even hung over Göring's bed at Carinhall. Peiner applied for admission to the NSDAP on July 13, 1937, and was admitted retrospectively to May 1 (membership number 4,913,473). In the same year he became a member of the Prussian Academy of Arts. Nevertheless, one of his paintings was confiscated as "degenerate art". In 1940 he was appointed to the Prussian State Council. In 1944, in the final phase of the Second World War, Adolf Hitler included him in the special list of the God-gifted list of the twelve most important visual artists.

In 1944, Peiner moved with his wife to Gimborn in Oberbergisches Land. After the war he was interned and all his property was confiscated. In 1948 he acquired the dilapidated Haus Vorst castle in Leichlingen/Rhineland, which he restored over the years. He lived and worked there until his death in Leichlingen, in 1984.

Like other German painters favored during the Third Reich, such as Conrad Hommel and Adolf Wissel, his reputation in Germany and in the Western world, was tainted after World War II - he then worked e.g. for the Ethiopian Emperor Haile Selassie.

In his last decades, he was mainly a landscape painter.

Art work
Peiner was mostly inspired by the old masters, such as Pieter Bruegel the Elder. In 1928, he still created a series of Impressionist-inspired landscapes. He had an realistic approach to art, which made him successful with his private clients. In the 1920s, when he painted in the New Objectivity style, he was a sought-after portrait painter in the Rhineland.

Peiner most important works during the Third Reich where his tapestries. His Nazi commissioned works, included the cycle of the German Battles of Fate for the Marble Gallery, also known as the Long Hall, of the New Reich Chancellery, in Berlin, the drafts of which are now exhibited in the Rheinisches Landesmuseum Bonn. He created drafts, and the theme of a seventh tapestry, measuring 5.40 by 10 meters, related to battles of Germany's history, namely The Battle of the Teutoburg Forest, Heinrich I in the Battle of Hungary, The Siege of Marienburg, The Battle of the Turks near Vienna, Frederick the Great near Kunersdorf, The Battle of Leipzig, and Tank Battle of Cambrai. The eighth tapestry was intended to depict a decisive battle from World War II. Peiner also created the cartoon for the monumental tapestry Die Erdkugel, begun but not completed at the Paris Manufacture des Gobelins and destined for Hermann Göring's monumental Carinhall estate. It was exhibited at the Munich Hypo-Kunsthalle in the exhibition "The Threads of Modernity", from December 2019 to March 2020. Since the post-war period, his works have rarely been exhibited in public because of his involvement in National Socialist art politics.

He was represented with 33 works at the Great German Art Exhibitions, in the Munich House of German Art, from 1937 to 1944. In the post-war period, Peiner created tapestries for the Gerling Group and for the Ethiopian Emperor Haile Selassie.

References

1897 births
1984 deaths
Artists from Düsseldorf
20th-century German painters
20th-century German male artists
German male painters